Negahban is an Iranian surname. Notable people with the name include:

 Ezzat Negahban (1926–2009), Iranian archaeologist
 Navid Negahban (born 1968), Iranian American actor

Surnames of Iranian origin